Buoban Pamang (RTGS: Buaban Phamang, born 27 December 1983 in Chiang Rai) is a female javelin thrower from Thailand. 
In 2006, she won the Athletics at the Asian Games in a new national record of 61.31 metres. In 2007, she took another gold medal, at the 2007 Summer Universiade in another national record of 61.40 metres. Later that year she competed at the 2007 World Championships, but without reaching the final. The next year she competed at the 2008 Olympic Games.

International competitions

References
 

1983 births
Living people
Buoban Pamang
Buoban Pamang
Female javelin throwers
Buoban Pamang
Buoban Pamang
Athletes (track and field) at the 2008 Summer Olympics
Asian Games medalists in athletics (track and field)
Buoban Pamang
Athletes (track and field) at the 2006 Asian Games
Buoban Pamang
Universiade medalists in athletics (track and field)
Southeast Asian Games medalists in athletics
Buoban Pamang
Medalists at the 2006 Asian Games
Competitors at the 2003 Southeast Asian Games
Competitors at the 2005 Southeast Asian Games
Buoban Pamang
Medalists at the 2007 Summer Universiade
Buoban Pamang